Acacia macdonnelliensis, commonly known as the MacDonnell mulga or the Hill mulga, is a species of Acacia native to central Australia.

Taxonomy
There are two subspecies:
Acacia macdonnelliensis subsp. macdonnelliensis 
Acacia macdonnelliensis subsp. teretifolia Maslin

Description
It has sparsely hoary to glabrous branchlets with obscure, resinous ridges. It produces yellow flowers in July. After flowering linear pale brown seed pods form that are constricted between each seed.

Distribution and habitat
Acacia macdonelliensis is found in southern parts of the Northern Territory around Alice Springs and in far eastern Pilbara and north eastern Goldfields regions of Western Australia. It grows in areas of sandstone and quartzite along rocky ridges and creeklines. A. macdonnelliensis is drought and frost tolerant.

References

macdonnelliensis
Fabales of Australia
Plants described in 1978